William Bardolf (died 1275 or 1276), was an English baronial leader.

Bardolf was lord of Wormegay, Norfolk, in right of his mother, who was the daughter and heiress of William de Warenne. In 1243, he had control of his lands, and in 1258, in the parliament of Oxford, he was elected one of the twelve baronial members of the council of twenty-four appointed to reform the realm.

By the Provisions of Oxford, he was made Constable of Nottingham, and was among those offered pardon by Henry III of England, on 7 December 1261. Adhering to the barons, he became one of their sureties for observing the Mise of Amiens, and was again entrusted by them with Nottingham, but surrendered it to the king after his victory at Northampton on 13 April 1264. Bardolf joined the king, and was taken prisoner by the barons at Lewes on 14 May 1264.

He died in 1275 or 1276, his son gaining control of his lands in the fourth year of Edward I's reign.

References

Year of birth missing
1275 deaths
13th-century English people
English feudal barons